Hapoel Ihud Bnei Jatt, is an Israeli football club based in Jatt. The club played in Liga Gimel Sharon division during the 2015–16 season.

History
The club was founded in 2011 and joined Liga Gimel, playing in the Samaria division in its first four seasons. The club finished second in 2012–13, missing out on promotion by four points after a tight title race with Hapoel Yokne'am. In 2015–16, the club was transferred to the Sharon division, which it won and was promoted to Liga Bet.

In the State Cup, the club's best achievement was reaching the seventh round, in 2015–16, beating Liga Bet club F.C. Roei Heshbon Tel Aviv 2–1 in the sixth round, and losing by the same score to Maccabi Herzliya from Liga Leumit.

External links
Hapoel Ihud Bnei Jatt  The Israel Football Association 
Facebook Page

References

Jatt
Jatt
Association football clubs established in 2011
2011 establishments in Israel
Arab-Israeli football clubs